Amours des feintes is an album by Jane Birkin. The album was released in 1990 and was the last original album of songs written by Serge Gainsbourg.
On the cover of the album there is a portrait of Birkin. Gainsbourg made it while he was in an emotional state of mind and that's why there are stains on the drawing because of the breaking of the pen.

Track listing
All lyrics and music by Serge Gainsbourg

Et quand bien même (4:16)   
Des ils et des elles (2:48) 
Litanie en lituanie (3:20) 
L'impression du déja-vu (3:55) 
Asphalte (3:44) 
Tombée des nues (3:06)  
Un amour peut en cacher un autre (3:18) 
32 fahrenheit (3:23) 
Love fifteen (3:10) 
Amours des feintes (4:29)

Personnel
Jane Birkin - vocals
Alan Parker - guitar, arranger
Andy Pask - bass
Barry Morgan - drums
Graham Todd - keyboards
Frank Ricotti - percussion
Bob Saker - backing vocals
Tony Burrows - backing vocals

Painting by Serge Gainsbourg - Artwork by Pearl Cholley and Philippe Huart

Jane Birkin albums
1990 albums
Philips Records albums